The .25 Remington (also known as the .25 Remington Auto-Loading) is an American rifle cartridge. A rimless, smokeless powder design, this cartridge was considered to be very accurate by period firearm experts and suitable for game up to deer and black bear. It was based on the .30 Remington cartridge.

The .25 Remington cartridge dates to 1906 and its introduction by Remington in the Model 8 rifle. Other rifles chambered for the .25 Remington include the Remington 14 slide-action, Remington 30 bolt action, Stevens 425 lever-action, and Standard Arms rifles. Due to their similar dimensions, the .25 Remington, .30 Remington, and .32 Remington together were known as the Remington Rimless cartridge series. Firearm manufacturers generally offered all three of these cartridges as chamberings in a rifle model rather than just one of the series.  The series was competitive with Winchester Repeating Arms Company's contemporary lever action offerings: .25-35 Winchester, .30-30, and .32 Winchester Special.

The .25 Remington case was shortened and necked down to .22 caliber to form Lysle Kilbourn's wildcat .22 Kilbourn Magnum Junior and the rimless version of Leslie Lindahl's wildcat .22 Chucker.

See also 
List of cartridges by caliber
List of rifle cartridges
Remington Model 14
6 mm caliber

References

External links

Pistol and rifle cartridges
Remington Arms cartridges